Don Corleon  (born Donovan Bennett; in 1978) is a Jamaican record producer, songwriter, and mixer. He has worked with artists including Migos, Sean Paul, Sizzla, Keyshia Cole , Rihanna, Bounty Killa, Vybz Kartel, Shaggy, Romeo Santos , Nicki Minaj, Pressure, Gentleman, Protoje and Pitbull.

Don Corleon wrote and produced on Rihanna's 2006 single "Break It Off."

He has also produced tracks with Rihanna, Bounty Killer, Elephant Man,  Wayne Marshall and TOK.

References 

Jamaican dancehall musicians
Jamaican record producers
1978 births
Living people